Damian King is an Australian professional bodyboarder. He was World Bodyboarding Champion twice, in 2003 and 2004. In 2011 he won the Dropknee World Tour becoming the first bodyboarder in history to win both prone and dropknee world titles.

Biography
King grew up in Port Macquarie, New South Wales, which is world-renowned in bodyboarding culture for the level of talent and number of bodyboarders it has produced. The first Australian bodyboarding world champion, Michael Eppelstun, also came from Port Macquarie. The city was officially recognised in 2010 as the "Bodyboarding Capital of Australia" and it is claimed by the Port Macquarie Bodyboarding Association to be the "Bodyboarding Capital of the World".

King cited the death of his mother as motivation for winning his first World Championship in 2003.

Professional career
2003 IBA World Champion
2004 IBA World Champion
2011 IBA Dropknee World Champion

Filmography
The Joker (2004)
The Joker 2 (2008)

Product endorsement
As of 2013, King is now a team rider for Found Boards, an Australian-based bodyboarding company owned by professional bodyboarder and entrepreneur Mitchell Rawlins. He is also a team rider for Unite Clothing Company, an Australian surfwear company.

References
IBA World Tour Damian King profile
Turbo Bodyboards Damian King profile
Unite Clothing Company Damian King profile
Damian King: making waves (1 August 2004) Reporter :Tim Sheridan at NineMSN

Year of birth missing (living people)
Living people
Australian surfers
Bodyboarders
Sportsmen from New South Wales

People from Port Macquarie